Thomas Leighton (c. 1554 – 17 May 1600) was an English soldier and politician.

He was the eldest son of Sir Edward Leighton of Wattlesborough Castle and his second wife Anne Dayrell, daughter of Paul Dayrell of Lillingstone Dayrell, Buckinghamshire. He was a nephew of Sir Thomas Leighton, Governor of Guernsey. Both his father and his uncle are said to have enjoyed the trust of Queen Elizabeth I. He was educated at Shrewsbury School (1566) and studied law at the Inner Temple in 1571. He succeeded to his father's estates in 1593.

 Wattlesborough, the Leighton family home from 1471 to 1711.

As a young man, he was a soldier and may have served in the Low Countries. By 1588 he had become captain of the county's trained militia units.

He was a Justice of the Peace from c.1592 and a Deputy Lieutenant of Shropshire from 1596. He was a Member (MP) of the Parliament of England for Shropshire in 1597, although serious illness made it difficult for him to attend the House of Commons.

He died in 1600 and was buried at Alberbury. He was described as "a worthy gentleman, well-beloved by his shire". He had married Elizabeth, the daughter of Sir William Gerard, Lord Chancellor of Ireland and Dorothy Barton; they had 4 sons and 3 daughters, including Robert, the eldest son and heir. Robert was the ancestor of the Leighton baronets of Wattlesborough. Elizabeth survived Thomas, dying in 1626.

References

 

 

1550s births
1600 deaths
People educated at Shrewsbury School
English MPs 1597–1598
Deputy Lieutenants of Shropshire